Lolita Shante Gooden (born March 8, 1970), better known by her stage name Roxanne Shante, is an American rapper. Born and raised in the Queensbridge Projects of Queens, New York City. Shante first gained attention through the Roxanne Wars and was part of the Juice Crew. The 2017 film, Roxanne Roxanne, is a dramatization of Shante's life.

Early life and career 
Shante was born March 8, 1970. In 1984, she met Mr. Magic and Marley Marl outside the Queensbridge housing project. They discussed U.T.F.O., since the rap trio had failed to make an appearance at a concert. U.T.F.O. had recently released a single called "Hanging Out," which did not gain much critical acclaim; however, the B-side "Roxanne, Roxanne", about a woman who would not respond to their advances, became a hit. Shante, who was a member of the Juice Crew, was contracted to write a track in rebuttal to U.T.F.O.'s rap, posing as the Roxanne in the U.T.F.O. song. Marley Marl produced the song "Roxanne's Revenge" using the original beats from an instrumental version of "Roxanne, Roxanne". The track became an instant hit and made Shante, only 14 years old at the time, one of the first female MCs to become very popular. Following this, the "Roxanne Wars" started, and Shante continued to rap and started touring with her producer, the Real Roxanne.

In 1985, Shante released a record together with rapper Sparky D, who had earlier released a diss track about her called "Sparky's Turn, Roxanne You're Through". The record called "Round One, Roxanne Shanté vs Sparky Dee" was released by Spin Records and included six tracks: the two original battle tracks ("Roxanne's Revenge" and "Sparky's Turn") as well as "Roxanne's Profile" by Shante, "Sparky's Profile" by Sparky D and a battle track, in which the two rappers freestyle and diss each other, in a censored and an uncensored version. Other hits included "Have a Nice Day" and "Go on Girl". In 1985, Shante battled Busy Bee Starski for the title of "best freestyle rapper" but lost due to improper judging. Judge Kurtis Blow later admitted to Shante that he did not vote for her because she was a girl. The ongoing battle with KRS-One hit its height when KRS-One claimed in his 1986 track "The Bridge Is Over" that Shante was nothing more than a sexual appendage to male rappers. Shante released Bad Sister in 1989, The Bitch Is Back in 1992, and a greatest hits anthology in 1995.

Hiatus 
By the age of 25 Shante was largely retired from the recording industry. She continued to make occasional guest appearances and live performances, as well as mentor young female hip-hop artists. She made a cameo appearing on VH1's hip hop reality show Ms. Rap Supreme giving rap-battle strategies to the finalists of the show. She was in a series of Sprite commercials during the late 1990s.
She returned to performing, and in 2008, her song "Roxanne's Revenge" was ranked number 42 on VH1's 100 Greatest Songs of Hip Hop. Shante re-recorded the song the following year. In an interview with EmEz in 2015, she said that she had just been proposed to and that she had previously been married. In the same interview, she said that KRS-One was one of her favorite rappers.

Biographical claims 
It was reported by Blender in 2008, and more extensively in a New York Daily News account in 2009, that Shante earned a bachelor's degree from Marymount Manhattan College and a master's and Ph.D in psychology from Cornell University. The articles said that a quirk in her recording contract obligated Warner Music to fund her college education. These were not new claims by Shante; she spoke at length about them on the Beef II documentary which was released in 2004. However an investigation by lawyer and journalist Ben Sheffner for Slate magazine found no evidence of Shante's claims. She was never signed to a Warner Music label, but was under contract to the independent label Cold Chillin' Records, which in turn was distributed by Reprise/Warner Bros. Records from 1987 to 1992. Academic records indicate that she attended only three months at Marymount Manhattan College. Shante never earned a degree and she is unlicensed by New York State officials to practice psychology or similar disciplines. The Daily News then ran a five-paragraph correction. Shante apologized in November 2009.

Roxanne Roxanne film 
A dramatized biopic about Shante's life, Roxanne Roxanne, was first shown at the 2017 Sundance Film Festival. It received critical acclaim and the lead actress Chanté Adams won best breakout performance for her portrayal of Shante. The film was co-produced by Forest Whitaker and Pharrell Williams; it was written and directed by Michael Larnell. It was bought by the film studio Neon for general release later in 2017.

Legacy
At the height of her career, Shante was referred to as the "Queen of Rap" by The New York Times and has been noted as a hip-hop pioneer. The Sunday Times credited her for popularizing diss tracks. Billboard editor Natalie Weiner wrote that Shante's "blazingly male-shaming diss track" and "hip-hop's first recorded beef" helped move hip-hop further toward the mainstream, calling her "rap's first female star." Consequence considered her "a mentor for generations of female MCs, and an early advocate in rap for female empowerment." In 1989, The Christian Science Monitor stated that the popularity of rappers like Roxanne Shante, Salt-N-Pepa, and MC Lyte created a path for the next generation of female hip hop artists.

Discography

Studio albums 
 Bad Sister (1989)
 The Bitch Is Back (1992)

References 

1970 births
American women rappers
African-American women rappers
Cold Chillin' Records artists
Five percenters
Living people
People from Long Island City, Queens
Rappers from New York City
People who fabricated academic degrees
21st-century American rappers
21st-century American women musicians
21st-century African-American women
20th-century African-American people
20th-century African-American women
Juice Crew members
21st-century women rappers